Patrol Forces Southwest Asia (PATFORSWA) is a United States Coast Guard command based in Manama, Bahrain. PATFORSWA was created in November 2002 as a contingency operation to support the U.S. Navy with patrol boats. The command's mission is to train, equip, deploy and support combat-ready Coast Guard forces conducting operations in support of Operation Iraqi Freedom (OIF), Operation Enduring Freedom (OEF) and Operation Inherent Resolve (OIR) in the Naval Forces Central Command's area of responsibility.
It was commissioned as a permanent duty station in June 2004. In July 2003 PATFORSWA moved from its own compound to facilities at Naval Support Activity Bahrain.

Elements

Patrol boats

[[File:USCG PATFORSWA member underway in the Arabian Gulf.png|thumb|right|A member of USCGC Adak'''s boarding team conducting training in the Persian Gulf.]]
The Coast Guard made plans to base six new Sentinel-class cutters in Bahrain to replace the aging Island-class cutters. The first two replacement cutters Charles Moulthrope and Robert Goldman passed through the Suez Canal on 7 May 2021 on their way to Manama, Bahrain. They arrived at their new homeport on 25 May 2021 to replace the cutters Adak and Aquidneck, which were subsequently decommissioned in Bahrain on 15 June 2021. The next two replacement cutters Glen Harris and Emlen Tunnell sailed for Bahrain before the end of 2021. After the arrival of Glen Harris and Emlen Tunnell but before the arrival of John Scheuerman and Clarence Sutphin Jr., the cutters Maui, Monomoy and Wrangell were decommissioned on 22 March 2022. The cutters John Scheuerman and Clarence Sutphin Jr. arrived in Bahrain on 23 August 2022 and Baranof was decommissioned on 26 September 2022.

Unit History

Establishment
Initial preparations for naval operations supporting OIF began with the U.S. Navy in the
summer and fall of 2002. The navy drew upon its standing contingency plans for combat
operations involving Iraq and, in September 2002, United States Naval Forces Central Command
(NAVCENT) requested U.S. Coast Guard support for a mission termed “Operation Iraqi
Freedom.” The Navy saw the Coast Guard's cutters and skilled personnel as ideally suited to
naval operations supporting Operation Iraqi Freedom. The shallow coastal areas and waterways
of Iraq are subject to heavy silting and strategists believed that Iraq's primary threat to American
naval units came from small boats, patrol craft and mine laying vessels. The Coast Guard's
patrol boats would expand the naval presence to shallow littoral areas where larger naval
combatants could not navigate and Coast Guard cutters could remain on station for days as
opposed to only a few hours typical of the Navy's Special Forces boats. In addition, the law
enforcement background of Coast Guard personnel would expand the Navy's ability to intercept
and board Iraqi vessels and Coast Guard cutters could serve in force protection and escort duty,
thereby freeing naval assets to conduct offensive combat operations. Such naval integration of Coast Guard forces relied upon lessons learned during Vietnam with the deployment of Coast Guard Squadron One and the end of the Cold War with Patrol Boat Squadrons Two and Four.

The Navy called on the Coast Guard to perform missions that have always formed part of
the service's peace-time mission. The Navy had very limited capability in boarding, maritime
interdiction and even environmental protection and yet operations in Iraq would require units
trained in these operations. As a result, the Coast Guard's Port Security Units (PSUs), Law Enforcement Detachments (LEDETs), National Strike Force (NSF), cutters and a variety of other units and personnel deployed overseas to support military operations in OIF. These units included cutters assigned to provide escort and force protection to battle groups and Military Sealift Command (MSC) convoys passing from the Strait of Gibraltar to the eastern Mediterranean.

As it had in previous American combat operations, the Coast Guard conducted operations well suited to cutters and their crews. The maritime conditions of Iraq and the Persian Gulf can greatly limit the operations of most naval vessels and warships. U.S.-led coalition forces that allied against the Iraqi regime of Saddam Hussein included Gulf-based nations that had their own coast guard forces. However, these particular coalition forces dedicated the use of their smaller vessels to protecting Kuwait, rather than operations in Iraqi territorial waters. Due to this and the Coast Guard's expertise in littoral and shallow-water operations, a large part of the request by United States Central Command (CENTCOM) centered on the Coast Guard's smaller patrol boats. Although various Coast Guard units and personnel had served in Operations Desert Shield and Desert Storm in the 1990s, deployment of the service's island-class patrol boats overseas would represent the first combat deployment of Coast Guard patrol boats since the Vietnam War.

Even though the Coast Guard served a similar mission in Vietnam, there existed no operational plan to provide guidance for OIF planning and preparations. The Coast Guard began its earliest preparations in the final months of 2002 and the lack of any pre-existing plan or blueprint for this sort of mission proved the Coast Guard's greatest challenge. The service's Atlantic Area Command (LANTAREA), headquartered in Portsmouth, Virginia, created a shore detachment to support its cutter operations overseas. These patrol forces detachments would oversee all aspects of operational support, including cutter maintenance and crew rotation. In October, LANTAREA created a shore detachment to oversee personnel, supply and maintenance requirements for patrol boat operations in the Persian Gulf. It designated this detachment as Patrol Forces, Southwest Asia (PATFORSWA). LANTAREA assigned a commanding officer of PATFORSWA and selected four 110-foot Island-class patrol boats (WPBs) for the mission based on their superior maintenance records. These WPBs included Adak, Aquidneck, Baranof and Wrangell. LANTAREA created a second shore detachment for patrol boat operations in the Mediterranean; designated it Patrol Forces, Mediterranean (PATFORMED); and selected four more patrol boats for Mediterranean service. These WPBs included Bainbridge Island, Grand Isle, Knight Island and Pea Island.

In 2004, two additional WPBs, Monomoy and Maui, were brought to the PATFORSWA fleet for a total number of six Coast Guard Patrol Boats in the Persian Gulf.

PATFORMED

The Coast Guard deployed its PATFORMED patrol boats in similar fashion to the PATFORSWA 110s. It took a monumental effort by PATFORMED support staff to prepare for patrol boat operations in the Mediterranean because no Coast Guard infrastructure existed in the region.

In the Mediterranean, Coast Guard operations supported naval and Military Sealift Command operations in the region. During combat operations in the Persian Gulf, PATFORMED patrol boats supported naval operations in the Mediterranean. The WPB's primary mission had been to escort U.S. Navy supply vessels and Military Sealift Command ships out of Souda Bay, Crete, the eastern Mediterranean's logistics port for American and NATO forces. The naval command cancelled this mission when Turkey would not support the use of its territory for supplying a northern front in Iraq. The four cutters then came under the operational command of the Navy's Task Force 60 for Leadership Interdiction Operations (LIO) in the eastern Mediterranean. This mission required the cutters to cut off a waterborne escape route for Iraqi leaders fleeing through Syria and into the Mediterranean. Syria, however, agreed to seal its borders, cutting off the escape route through its territory to the Mediterranean coast. Shortly after Syria closed its borders, the Sixth Fleet released the PATFORMED cutters from operations in the Mediterranean, the cutters then returned to United States.

Maritime Engagement Team (MET)

The Maritime Engagement Team (MET) is responsible for providing specialized law enforcement training to all cutters in theater and certifying their Level II Non-Compliant Boarding Teams. They also regularly augment other teams and assets in theater and perform boardings in the Persian Gulf, train foreign military units throughout the region, and conduct demonstrations for visiting VIPs.

Redeployment Assistance Inspection Detachments
Redeployment Assistance Inspection Detachments (RAID) consisted of Coast Guardsmen deployed with the U.S Army to support the shipment of materials in and out of war zones. Their mission was to assist the Department of Defense with the safe re-deployment of containerized cargo as well as the storage and segregation of hazardous materials. The Coast Guard's goal was to ensure that hazardous material was properly prepared for shipment and re-entry to U.S. ports.  The team moved between Forward Operating Bases, making them among the few Coast Guardsmen to have been so far forward with the U.S. Army in a combat zone.

The first RAID was deployed in 2003 and they were brought under the PATFORSWA command structure in 2010. The RAID was demobilized in May 2015. 

Shoreside Support and Security

Shoreside personnel augment and share responsibility for all cutter maintenance, much like a Maintenance Assistance Team and a Sector. In addition, all shoreside personnel provide Anti-Terrorism Force Protection (ATFP) support. To most observers, the Boat Division remains the most visible element of a PATFORSWA. The ATFP shore support team is tasked to provide protection to vessels in security zones and pier areas. They also provide security for internal unit functions such as the Command Center, Communications Center, berthing areas, mail delivery, Entry Control Points (ECPs), Vehicle Control Points (VCPs) and traffic control/vehicle movement.

2016 U.S. Iran Naval Incident
Referred to as the 2016 U.S.–Iran naval incident. PATFORSWA played an integral role in the rescue of the U.S. Navy Sailors. January 12, 2016, two United States Navy riverine command boats (RCBs) cruising from Kuwait to Bahrain with a combined crew of nine men and one woman on board strayed into Iranian territorial waters which extend three nautical miles around Farsi Island in the Persian Gulf. Patrol craft of Iran's Islamic Revolutionary Guard Corps (IRGC) Navy seized the craft and detained the crew at a military base on Farsi Island.

According to military sources, the two RCBs were on a routine transit from Kuwait to Bahrain, which serves as the home port for Task Force 56 under the Fifth Fleet. They left Kuwait at 12:23 p.m local time and were scheduled to refuel with the U.S. Coast Guard Island Class Patrol Cutter Monomoy at 5 p.m. During the transit one RCB developed an engine problem, and both boats stopped to solve the mechanical issue. During this time they drifted into Iranian waters. At 5:10 p.m. the boats were approached by the two small Iranian center-console craft followed by two more boats. There was a verbal exchange between the Iranian and U.S personnel and the officer commanding the RCBs allowed the Iranian sailors to come aboard and take control. The Iranian forces made the sailors kneel with their hands behind their heads. The RCBs reported their engine failure to Task Force 56, and all communications were terminated after the report. A U.S. search-and-rescue effort was launched leading to "robust bridge-to-bridge communications" with Iranian military vessels, wherein the Iranians informed U.S. Navy cruiser  at 5:15 p.m that “the RCBs and their crew were in Iranian custody at Farsi Island and were safe and healthy.” By the time a search-and-rescue effort got under way (it included sending a U.S. Navy and U.S. Coast Guard vessel inside Iranian territorial waters over concern U.S. sailors could have been lost overboard), the sailors were already ashore.

Secretary of State John Kerry, spoke with Iranian foreign minister Mohammad Javad Zarif at least five times by telephone. Kerry stated that in his other phone calls about the situation he "made it crystal clear" how serious it was and that "it was imperative to get it resolved." The sailors had a brief verbal exchange with the Iranian military and were released unharmed along with all their equipment  the next day on January 13 after 15 hours, and they departed the island at 08:43 GMT on their boats. They later were escorted by a U.S. Coast Guard patrol cutter, while the U.S. Navy overwatched and supported. The Pentagon oversaw the escort on high alert.

The IRGC stated that they released the sailors after their investigation concluded the “illegal entry into Iranian water was not the result of a purposeful act.”

United States Central Command stated, "A post-recovery inventory of the boats found that all weapons, ammunition and communication gear are accounted for minus two SIM Cards that appear to have been removed from two handheld satellite phones." The statement did not account for navigation equipment. A Navy command investigation continues and more details will be provided when it is completed.

The U.S. Navy disciplined and/or reprimanded nine of the sailors involved in the incident, ranging from higher commanders to sailors present on the boats.

 2018 Syrian missile strike 
During the 2018 Syrian missile strike, Patrol Forces Southwest Asia supported the action with the deployment of Adak and Aquidneck. The two patrol boats joined the  Surface Action Group, and subsequently launched 23 Tomahawk Land Attack Missiles against chemical weapons sites in Syria. Interestingly, Higgins, Adak, and Aquidneck'' previously worked together at the beginning of Operation Iraqi Freedom—also for TLAM strikes.

See also
 Port Security Unit
 Law Enforcement Detachments
 Deployable Operations Group
 Coast Guard Squadron One

References

Units and organizations of the United States Coast Guard